Grizzle is a surname. Notable people with the name include:

David Grizzle, American business executive
Mary R. Grizzle (1921–2006), American politician and advocate of the Equal Rights Amendment
Stanley G. Grizzle (1918–2016), Canadian citizenship judge and labour union activist
Trevor Lloyd Grizzle (born 1947), American academic and New Testament scholar

See also
Grizzly
Grizabella
Dog coat